Cui Jian (born 2 August 1961) is a Beijing-based Chinese singer-songwriter, trumpeter and guitarist. Affectionately called "Old Cui", he pioneered Chinese rock music. For this distinction Cui Jian is often labeled "The Father of Chinese Rock".

Early career
Cui Jian grew up in a musical family in Beijing. His father was ethnic Korean and a professional trumpet player, and his mother was a member of a Korean dance troupe. Cui Jian followed his father to start playing the trumpet at the age of fourteen. He joined the Beijing Symphony Orchestra in 1981, at the age of twenty. He was first introduced to rock during this period when friends smuggled in illicit recordings from Hong Kong and Bangkok. Inspired by the likes of Simon and Garfunkel and John Denver, Cui began learning to play the guitar.

In 1984 he formed his first band, Qi He Ban (七合板, literally "Seven-Ply Board," but notably called "Seven-Player band") with six other classically trained musicians, including the saxophonist/suona player Liu Yuan. The seminal band was heavily influenced by The Beatles, The Rolling Stones, and Talking Heads. They performed their own works—mostly soft rock and love songs—in local hotels and bars. With his band, Cui released his first cassette Return of the Prodigal that same year. The album contained mellow, pop-oriented love songs, but also showcased songs with progressive and folk-rock influences, which were fresh and innovative in China at the time. In 1985, the band released another album, titled Cui Jian with Seven-Player band. The album featured a combination of Western pop rock, as well as new originals. It also featured more prominent use of the electric guitar, which was seldom used in Chinese popular music. Cui's departure from the band and subsequent solo career led him to become the most successful and influential musician in Chinese rock history.

Cui Jian first shot to stardom in 1986, when he performed his song "Nothing to My Name" on the 100-Singer Concert of Year of International Peace at Beijing's Workers' Stadium. The following year, he left his permanent job with the orchestra. His band, now renamed ADO, included two foreign embassy employees: Hungarian bassist Kassai Balazs and Madagascan/French guitarist Eddie Randriamampionona. His first real album, Rock and Roll on the New Long March, was released in 1989.

In the late 1980s and early 1990s, Cui created a hybrid and experimental music mix that cut across divisions between pop, reggae, funk, hard rock and punk music genres. Cui's songs drew on folk and traditional music types, such as the Northwest Wind (Xibeifeng) peasant songs of the Loess Plateau of Shaanxi. At times they knowingly parodied old Communist Party sayings and proverbs. In 1991, for example, he set the old revolutionary song "Nanniwan" to rock music. In 1988 he performed at a concert broadcast worldwide in conjunction with the Seoul Summer Olympic Games. Cui Jian was the first-ever winner of the MTV International Viewer's Choice Award for his song/music video "Wild in the Snow" in 1991. 

His earliest works had influence from Western popular music styles, such as punk, dance and jazz; these songs also became his best-known works. With tensions rising among the students of China and the government, Cui's work was very influential among the youth.

Tiananmen and aftermath
Cui Jian reached the apex of his popularity during the Tiananmen Square protests of 1989, when "Nothing to My Name" became an anthem to student protestors. Before the protests were violently broken up on 4–5 June, Cui frequently appeared with the students and was affirmed by Wu'er Kaixi, one of the prominent leaders of the movement, as highly influential among young Chinese of the time. The following government crackdown forced many rock musicians, Cui Jian included, into hiding in the other provinces. Sanctions proved relatively temporary, and Cui was able to return to Beijing shortly afterward. In early 1990, the Chinese government would permit him to embark his first rock tour entitled the "New Long March", to raise money for the 1990 Asian Games.  Ten concerts were scheduled in Zhengzhou, Wuhan, Xi'an, Chengdu and others. Midway through the tour, Cui Jian gained notoriety for appearing on stage wearing a red blindfold across his eyes before performing his well-known political anthem, "A Piece of Red Cloth", prompting the government to terminate the performance and cancel the remainder of the tour. The tour was still able to raise 1 million yuan for the 1990 Asian Games.

Later career

Through the 1990s Cui Jian was banned from playing major venues in Beijing, although he was able to stage a number of one-set, word-of-mouth concerts at newly flourishing venues like The Sunflower Club. Elsewhere in China he was permitted to play to sell-out crowds in both large and small venues, only on occasion facing government interference. Soon, Cui's music was banned from all state-controlled broadcasting stations.

Cui toured all over the world including the United States and Europe four times each and has played numerous shows in East and Southeast Asia. Cui's ability to fuse western styles of music and introduce local influences on it, made him a very prominent figure internationally to this day. 
In 2000 Cui was awarded the prestigious Dutch Prince Claus Award for positive artistic and intellectual influences on the broader culture and society.

In 2002 Cui and his manager Paul Fry co-organized the Lijiang Snow Mountain Music Festival (China's Woodstock) in Lijiang, China. Cui followed this with a 10-city tour in Germany and performances with Udo Lindenberg (Godfather of German Rock & Roll), performances with Deep Purple in China and a 13-city sold-out tour of the United States.

Bai Qiang produced a 3D concert film and documentary on Cui. The film, Transcendence, which evokes memories of Tiananmen Square, was screened in Beijing in May 2012 to an enthusiastic fan audience, but its prospects for mainstream release in China are doubtful.

Political rehabilitation

On 8 September 2000, Cui and his band performed the song "Flying" at the Anti-Piracy Concert held at Worker's Stadium in Beijing. It was his first large-venue performance in the capital in 7 years. He wore a hat with a red star to show support for the Chinese Communist Party. 

In 2002, Cui initiated, produced, and played at a major rock festival in the mountains of Yunnan. The "Snow Mountain Music Festival" was a major media attraction and was reported by the international press as "China's Woodstock". This experience started a trend of outdoor music festivals in China.

In early 2003, Cui was authorized to open for the Rolling Stones' concert in Beijing. In a 2003 interview, Cui claimed that in the 1980s he had learned Rolling Stones and Beatles songs to improve his guitar skills. He was also quoted as having three dreams: to perform in his home city of Beijing again, to see the Rolling Stones perform live, and to perform together with the Rolling Stones. Due to the SARS outbreak, however, the concert was cancelled.

Not until March 2004, when Cui opened for Deep Purple on their mainland tour, was he finally able to perform a full set at a major venue in Beijing.

On 24 September 2005, Cui was finally granted permission to headline his own show at the Beijing Capital Stadium, which signified the end of the unofficial ban on his performances in China's capital. It also confirmed a major turn-around in government attitude towards rock music in general.

Cui did finally play with the Rolling Stones at the Shanghai Grand Stage on 8 April 2006, singing and playing "Wild Horses". Following the performance, Cui was quoted as saying, "This is the 20th anniversary of Chinese rock 'n' roll... We have an appointment. In the near future, they will be back, and we'll rock again in Beijing."

Cui performed in Taiwan on 8 July 2007 after numerous attempts in previous years to perform there had been derailed by governments on both sides of the Taiwan Strait. Cui's entourage to the island comprised 18 people including his 75-year-old mother. Headlining on the last day of the Hohaiyan Rock Festival at Fulong Beach, Cui's participation was promoted on the festival's website with the slogan: "He's really coming!"

In September 2007, he performed at the Beijing Pop Festival, including a guest appearance rapping with the American rap group Public Enemy.

On 4 December 2009, Cui returned to Taiwan for his second concert there in three years, for the grand opening of the Legacy Taipei.

Discography
1984: Return of the Prodigal (浪子归; Làngzǐ guī)
1989: Rock 'N' Roll on the New Long March (新长征路上的摇滚; Xīn chángzhēng lùshàng de yáogǔn)
1991: Solution (解决; Jiějué)
1994: Balls Under the Red Flag (红旗下的蛋; Hóngqí xià de dàn)
1998: The Power of the Powerless (无能的力量; Wúnéng de lìliàng) 
2005: Show You Colour (给你一点颜色; Gěi nǐ yīdiǎn yánsè)
2015: Frozen Light (光冻; Guāng dòng)
2021: A Flying Dog (飞狗; Féi gǒu)

Filmography
1993 – Beijing Bastards (北京杂种; Beijing Zazhong), directed by Zhang Yuan, as himself
2003 – Roots and Branches (我的兄弟姐妹; Wo de xiongdi jiemei), directed by Yu Chung, as the father/music teacher
2007 – The Sun Also Rises (太阳照常升起; Taiyang zhaochang shengqi), directed by Jiang Wen, as Tang's friend in Beijing
2010 – Dooman River (두만강), directed by Zhang Lu, as Chang-ho
2012 – Transcendence 3-D concert, directed by Bai Qiang
2013 – Promise, directed and written by himself
2013 – Blue Sky Bones

See also
 
Chinese rock
Tang Dynasty (band)
Viktor Tsoi, Russian rock singer of Korean descent

References

Wei, S. Louisa (2006). "Cui Jian: Rocking China" (DV).  Music documentary.

External links

 Cui Jian's Official Website 
 "Birth Of A Beijing Music Scene" by Matthew Corbin Clark – companion article to PBS Frontline's "China in the Red".
 Cui Jian on Rockinchina.com

Interviews
Cui Jian interview from Global Rhythm magazine, August 2008

1961 births
Living people
Chinese guitarists
Chinese male singer-songwriters
Chinese people of Korean descent
Chinese rock singers
Musicians from Beijing
Singers from Beijing